Esenkaya can refer to:

 Esenkaya, Kale
 Esenkaya, Mudurnu